Plainland is a rural locality and development centre in the Lockyer Valley Region, Queensland, Australia.

Geography

History
Plainland was settled by a dozen German families in 1878. The families were mostly from West Prussia. The community constructed a Lutheran church in 1884 which was replaced in 1897. About 60 families, mainly of German origin were living in the area in 1911—serviced by three blacksmiths, the Plainland Hotel, a state school and a general store.

Plainland State School opened circa 1886. It closed on 1966.

Plainland Post Office opened by 1899 (a receiving office had been open from 1887) and closed in 1966.

The area experienced a general decline in population throughout the mid-20th century until the 1990s when significant development began.

Faith Lutheran College opened on 1999.

At the  Plainland had a population of 1,672 people.

In the late 2010s. the area experienced a boom in development with projects such as Plainland Crossing and Meadows at Plainland, expanding the availability of rural residential properties.

Sophia College opened in 2021 with Year 7 enrolments.

A variety of new civic services such as schools, services, and large-chain shopping options have also been developed or announced. The town has also been identified as a growth hub, and the preferred location for a new regional hospital to provide emergency and maternity services to the Lockyer Valley.

Events 
A farmers' market is held adjacent to the hotel on Sundays.

Education 

Faith Lutheran College is a private secondary (7-12) school for boys and girls at 5 Faith Avenue, operated by Lutheran Education Queensland. In 2016, the school had an enrolment of 719 students with 56 teachers (53.95 full-time equivalent) and 63 non-teaching staff (48.95 full-time equivalent). In 2017, the school had an enrolment of 711 students with 59 teachers (57 full-time equivalent) and 63 non-teaching staff (43 full-time equivalent).

Sophia College is a Catholic secondary school for boys and girls on the south-west corner of Otto Road and Gehrke Road.

References

External links

 

Lockyer Valley Region
Localities in Queensland